The 1997 Railway Cup Hurling Championship was the 69th staging of the Railway Cup since its establishment by the Gaelic Athletic Association in 1927. The cup began on 8 November 1997 and ended on 9 November 1997.

Munster were the defending champions.

On 9 November 1997, Munster won the cup after a 0-14 to 0–10 defeat of Leinster in the final at Duggan Park. This was their 41st Railway Cup title overall and their third title in succession.

Results

Semi-finals

Final

Bibliography

 Donegan, Des, The Complete Handbook of Gaelic Games (DBA Publications Limited, 2005).

References

Railway Cup Hurling Championship
Railway Cup Hurling Championship
Hurling